The 2015 FIM CEV Moto3 Junior World Championship was the fourth CEV Moto3 season and the second under the FIM banner. The season was held over 12 races at 8 meetings, began on 26 April at Algarve and finished on 15 November at Valencia.

Calendar

Entry list

Championship standings

Scoring system
Points are awarded to the top fifteen finishers. A rider has to finish the race to earn points.

Riders' Championships

Constructors' Championship

See also
 2015 FIM CEV Moto2 European Championship season

References

External links
 

FIM CEV Moto3 Junior World Championship
CEV Moto3
CEV Moto3